German submarine U-987 was a Type VIIC U-boat of Nazi Germany's Kriegsmarine during World War II.

She was ordered on 25 May 1941, and was laid down on 2 October 1942 at Blohm & Voss, Hamburg, as yard number 187. She was launched on 2 June 1943 and commissioned under the command of Oberleutnant zur See Hilmar-Karl Schreyer on 8 July 1943.

Design
German Type VIIC submarines were preceded by the shorter Type VIIB submarines. U-987 had a displacement of  when at the surface and  while submerged. She had two shafts and two  propellers.

U-987 was fitted with five  torpedo tubes (four fitted at the bow and one at the stern), fourteen torpedoes or 26 TMA mines, one  SK C/35 naval gun, 220 rounds, and one twin  C/30 anti-aircraft gun. The boat had a complement of between 44 — 52 men.

Service history
On 15 June 1944, 19 days out of Stavanger on her first, and only war patrol, U-987 was sunk by torpedoes west of Narvik, in the Norwegian Sea. U-987 was attacked by the British submarine . All Fifty-three of her crew were lost.

Wolfpacks
U-987 took part in one wolfpack, namely:
 Trutz (2 – 15 June 1944)

References

External links

Bibliography

German Type VIIC submarines
U-boats commissioned in 1943
World War II submarines of Germany
Ships built in Hamburg
1943 ships
Maritime incidents in June 1944
World War II shipwrecks in the Norwegian Sea